The Latin Rite Roman Catholic Diocese of Christchurch is a suffragan diocese of the Roman Catholic Archdiocese of Wellington. Its cathedral and see city are located in Christchurch, the largest city in the South Island of New Zealand. It was formed on 5 May 1887 from a portion of the territory of the Diocese of Wellington, which was elevated to archdiocese later that same month.

Bishops of Christchurch

Lyons was translated to become Auxiliary Bishop of Sydney, Australia in 1950. Martin was appointed Coadjutor Archbishop of Wellington, New Zealand in 2021.

Current bishop 
 Michael Gielen

Bishops other than ordinaries

Coadjutor bishops
Denis William Hanrahan (1984–1985)
Barry Jones (2006–2007)

Auxiliary bishops
John Cunneen (1992–1995), appointed Bishop here

Affiliated bishops
Charles Drennan, appointed Coadjutor Bishop of Palmerston North in 2011; succeeded 2012; resigned 2019
Stephen Lowe, appointed Bishop of Hamilton in New Zealand in 2014

Cathedral and churches

Cathedrals 

 Cathedral of the Blessed Sacrament (demolished)
 Christchurch Catholic Cathedral (to be completed by 2025)

Pro-cathedral 

 St Mary's Pro-Cathedral

Churchs 

 St Mary's Catholic Church, Hokitika. Following a structural assessment triggered by the February 2011 Christchurch earthquake, the church was closed to the public in June 2012.

 Chapel of the Snows at McMurdo Station on Ross Island, Antarctica. For 57 years, the diocese was responsible for sending priests to the non-denominational Christian. This practice was stopped in 2015. It is the second southernmost religious building in the world.

Secondary schools

Catholic Cathedral College, Christchurch
John Paul II High School, Greymouth
Marian College, Christchurch
Roncalli College, Timaru
St Bede's College, Papanui, Christchurch
St Thomas of Canterbury College, Upper Riccarton, Christchurch
Villa Maria College, Upper Riccarton, Christchurch

See also
Holy Cross Seminary
 Holy Name Seminary
 Father Bernard O'Brien SJ
 Roman Catholicism in New Zealand
 List of New Zealand Catholic bishops

References

External links

Catholic Diocese of Christchurch

Christchurch
Christchurch
Christchurch
Religion in Christchurch
1887 establishments in New Zealand